Franklin "Frank" Merblum is an American bridge player. He lives in Bloomfield, Connecticut.

Merblum and regular partner Doug Doub have two firsts and two seconds in the annual grass-roots North American Pairs championship (Flight A), spanning from 2001 to 2014. They have won the New England (District 25) stage eight times.

In 2018 Merblum reached the semi-finals of the US Bridge Championships playing with Jeffrey Juster on a team with Adam Grossak, Zachary Grossak, Howard Weinstein, and Adam Wildavsky.

Bridge accomplishments

Wins

 North American Bridge Championships (4)
Grand National Teams (1) 2016 
 Von Zedtwitz Life Master Pairs (1) 2014 
 North American Pairs (2) 2001, 2010

Runners-up

 North American Bridge Championships (3)
North American Pairs (2) 2003, 2014 
 Grand National Teams (1) 2008

References

American contract bridge players
Living people
Place of birth missing (living people)
Year of birth missing (living people)